This page lists the Barbershop Harmony Society's international chorus champions by the year within which they won. Choruses are eligible to win any number of times but must sit out for two years after they win. The only non-U.S. choruses to win this championship were The Dukes Of Harmony (1977 & 1980) and the Toronto Northern Lights (2013), both from Canada.  The Dallas-based Vocal Majority has won this competition a record 13 times. Disruption caused by the COVID-19 pandemic resulted in cancellation of the 2020 and 2021 chorus contests.

See also
List of Barbershop Harmony Society quartet champions
 Sweet Adelines International competition

External links
Official list from the Barbershop Harmony Society
Barberscore, BHS "contest manager"

Barbershop Harmony Society
Barbershop music
Chorus champions by year
Chorus champions by year